Christian Jones (born 27 September 1979) is an Australian racing driver; he is the adopted son of 1980 Formula One World Champion Alan Jones.

Biography
Winning several Karting championships in his early teens, Christian moved to Australian Formula Ford in 1996-1998, with his best season finish of 2nd in 1998. Later that year he moved to Formula Palmer Audi winter series, placing 4th in the championship. A brief return to racing in 2000 with a Ferrari in Australia's GT Championship (PROCAR), lead to a full return at the end of the 2002 Australian Formula Three Championship, which saw him place 4th in the 2003 title. In 2004 he won the Asian Formula Three Championship and subsequently entered the 2004 Macau Grand Prix, finishing 17th. In 2005 he represented Australia in the A1 Grand Prix series. 2007 saw Jones return to Asia and the Porsche Carrera Cup Asian Championship where he finished 3rd. The same year saw Jones make his Porsche Supercup debut at the Turkish Grand Prix support race in Istanbul. For 2007/08 he has been linked to the new Speedcar Series, based in the Middle East, following the A1 Grand Prix calendar. Also linked are Jean Alesi and Ukyo Katayama but continued in the Carrera Cup Asia Championship placing fourth and also the Surfers Paradise round of the Australian Carrera Cup Championship placing sixth for the round

He made a return to racing in the 2009 Malaysia Merdeka Endurance Race for Team Hong Kong Racing driving an Aston Martin Vantage GT2 and in 2011 driving for the Asia Pacific Arrows Racing Lamborghini Gallardo LP560 GT3 placing fourth.

Career results

Complete A1 Grand Prix results

(key) (Races in bold indicate pole position) (Races in italics indicate fastest lap)

References

External links
 
 1996 Australian Formula Ford Championship
 1997 Australian Formula Ford Championship
 1998 Australian Formula Ford Championship

Australian racing drivers
A1 Team Australia drivers
Australian Formula 3 Championship drivers
Asian Formula Three Championship drivers
Living people
1979 births
Australian people of English descent
Formula Ford drivers
Formula Palmer Audi drivers
Porsche Supercup drivers
A1 Grand Prix drivers
Alan Docking Racing drivers